LTU Austria (legally LTU Billa Lufttransport Unternehmen GmbH) was an Austrian airline based in Vienna. It operated charter services to destinations in the Mediterranean and Red Sea. Its main base was Vienna International Airport.

History
The airline was established in 2004 by Billa, parent company of Austrian tour operator ITS-BIlla. It obtained its air operators certificate on 1 April 2004. It was wholly owned by Billa. LTU Austria has ceased operations as they have transferred their Airbus A320-200 to LTU in 2008.

Fleet 

During their history, LTU Austria exclusively operated Airbus A320-200 aircraft.  OE-LTU featured a fully economy class specification, meanwhile OE-LTV utilised a 24 seat business class cabin alongside 144 economy class seats. Following the airlines closure, the remaining aircraft in their fleet was transferred to Air Berlin.

References

External links

Official website

Defunct airlines of Austria
Airlines established in 2004
Airlines disestablished in 2008
2004 establishments in Austria
2008 disestablishments in Austria